Gregory Schaken (born 23 February 1989 in Rotterdam) is a Dutch footballer who is currently unattached.

He formerly played for FC Utrecht and on loan for Telstar.

External links
Gregory Schaken at Voetbal International

1989 births
Living people
Dutch footballers
Dutch sportspeople of Surinamese descent
FC Utrecht players
SC Telstar players
Eredivisie players
Eerste Divisie players
Footballers from Rotterdam
Association football forwards